Stypommisa is a genus of horse flies in the family Tabanidae.

Species
Stypommisa abdominalis (Philip, 1960)
Stypommisa affinus Kröber, 1929
Stypommisa anoriensis Fairchild & Wilkerson, 1986
Stypommisa antennina Philip, 1970
Stypommisa apaches Philip, 1977
Stypommisa apicalis Fairchild & Wilkerson, 1986
Stypommisa aripuana Fairchild & Wilkerson, 1986
Stypommisa bipuncta Fairchild, 1979
Stypommisa bolviensis (Kröber, 1930)
Stypommisa callicera (Bigot, 1892)
Stypommisa captiroptera (Kröber, 1930)
Stypommisa changena Fairchild, 1986
Stypommisa ferruginosa (Walker, 1850)
Stypommisa flavescens (Kröber, 1930)
Stypommisa fulviventris (Macquart, 1846)
Stypommisa furva (Hine, 1920)
Stypommisa glandicolor (Lutz, 1912)
Stypommisa hypographa (Kröber, 1930)
Stypommisa jaculator (Fairchild, 1942)
Stypommisa kroeberi Fairchild & Wilkerson, 1986
Stypommisa lerida (Fairchild, 1942)
Stypommisa maruccii (Fairchild, 1947)
Stypommisa modica (Hine, 1920)
Stypommisa paraguayensis (Kröber, 1930)
Stypommisa pequeniensis (Fairchild, 1942)
Stypommisa punctipennis Enderlein, 1923
Stypommisa ramosi Gorayeb & Fairchild, 1987
Stypommisa rubrithorax (Macquart, 1838)
Stypommisa scythropa (Schiner, 1868)
Stypommisa serena (Kröber, 1931)
Stypommisa spilota Fairchild & Wilkerson, 1986
Stypommisa tantula (Hine, 1920)
Stypommisa u-nigrum Philip, 1977
Stypommisa venosa (Bigot, 1892)
Stypommisa vidali Rafael, Gorayeb & Rosa, 1992
Stypommisa xanthicornis Fairchild & Wilkerson, 1986

References

Tabanidae
Tabanoidea genera
Diptera of South America
Taxa named by Günther Enderlein